Richard Morton may refer to:

 Richard Alan Morton (1899 - 1977), British biochemist
 Richard Morton (basketball) (born 1966), retired American professional basketball player and coach
 Richard Morton (physician)  (1637–1698), English physician
 Ricky Morton (born 1956), American professional wrestler